William Winter (July 15, 1836 – June 30, 1917) was an American dramatic critic and author.

Biography
William Winter was born on July 15, 1836 in Gloucester, Massachusetts. He graduated from Harvard Law School in 1857.

Winter wore many literary hats during his long, illustrious career: theater critic, biographer, poet, and essayist. He is known for his Romantic style poetry, and for his long career as an editor and writer for some of New York City's great papers.

Winter was a tour de force in the original Bohemian scene of Greenwich Village, going on to become one of the most influential men of letters of the last half of the 19th century and the pre-eminent drama critic and biographer of the times.  Winter became the unofficial biographer of the Pfaff's Circle of Greenwich Village of which he was a part. The Pfaffians spawned the careers of such writers as Walt Whitman and Mark Twain.

By 1854 Winter had already published a collection of verse and worked as a reviewer for the Boston Transcript; he befriended Pfaffian Thomas Bailey Aldrich after reviewing a volume of his poetry. He relocated to New York in 1856. Winter became a regular at the center of Greenwich Village's Bohemian hotspot, Pfaff's, where artists, renegades, and radical thinkers of all kinds converged. This was where Walt Whitman, Mark Twain, Winslow Homer, Edwin Booth, Adah Isaacs Menken, Ada Clara, Horatio Alger Jr and an endless list of the Bohemian crowd came to mix with the journalists and radical political thinkers of the times. It was where one came to explore a new counter-culture in the Village, a salon of the Civil War era where the unconventional literati would gather-a place where no topic was off limits and all eccentricities were embraced.

Winter was at the heart of this influential circle known as The Pfaffians who gathered weekly at the Vault at Pfaff's Beer Hall on Broadway and Bleeker. The Pfaff Bohemians would lay the foundation for Winter's entire life and career as both a poet and a writer. He later described some of his life as a young Pfaffian, describing the extraordinary scene and the many great minds he encountered in his biography Old Friends (1909). He also wrote introductions and brief biographies for the editions of the collected works of Pfaff's regulars like Fitz James O'Brien, John Brougham, and George Arnold.

"The vault at Pfaffs where the drinkers and laughers meet to eat and drink and carouse." —Walt Whitman

At Pfaff's, Winter quickly was embraced due to his great wit and writing talents, becoming the right-hand man to Henry Clapp Jr's circle of Pfaffian's. Clapp soon made him assistant editor and literary critic to one of the first truly Bohemian publications in America, the  literary and social commentary weekly, The Saturday Press, in print from 1858-1866. Here is where Walt Whitman and Mark Twain published their earliest works, and was the main publication of the Pfaffian Circle.

In 1860 Winter married Scottish poet and novelist Elizabeth Campbell, raising their five children in Staten Island, New York.

Winter went on to a stellar writing and editorial career at some of New York City's most influential papers, working as a dramatic and literary critic for the Albion and Harper's Weekly, as well as Horace Greeley's Tribune for more than 40 years. His piercing wit and brilliant writing made him the leading stage historian and theater critic of the 19th century (W. Eaton, "William Winter").

In the 1880s he began publishing biographies of thespians like the Jefferson family and Edwin Booth. Winter opposed the modernist theater of playwrights like Ibsen, and maintained that drama should be a moral force. His 1912 The Wallet of Time offers a fascinating retrospective look at the development of nineteenth-century theater; in the preface, he states that "[a] ruling purpose of my criticism has been... to oppose, denounce, and endeavor to defeat the policy which, in unscrupulous greed of gain, allows the Theatre to become an instrument to vitiate public taste and corrupt public morals" (xxiv). Winter's work on New York's theatrical scene details the careers, pursuits, and tastes of the major players and plays. He encouraged actors and writers to acknowledge the "use of a power manifestly greater in modern society than it ever was before in the history of civilization... and, if possible, to exert a beneficial influence on the mind of the rising generation, -- the generation that will support the Drama, determine its spirit, and shape its destiny" .

He died in New Brighton, Staten Island on June 30, 1917 after a bout of angina pectoris. He was buried at Silver Mount Cemetery.

Archives
Winter left two significant archives of biographies and essays on stars like Edwin Booth and Sir Henry Irving, in addition to career papers documenting his work as a writer and critic. Part of his archive was purchased by theatre and film producer and collector Messmore Kendall, who donated his collection of William Winter's papers and books along with Harry Houdini's archive to the University of Texas at Austin, where it is now available for research at the Harry Ransom Center.

His enormously prolific legacy is also preserved at the Folger Shakespeare Library's Robert Young Collection on William Winter.

In 1886, in commemoration of the death of his son, he founded a library at Staten Island Academy in Stapleton, New York.

Works
His writings include:

 The Convent, and other Poems (Boston, 1854)
 The Queen's Domain, and other Poems (1858)
 My Witness: a Book of Verse (1871)
 Sketch of the Life of Edwin Booth (1871)
 Thistledown: a Book of Lyrics (1878)
 The Trip to England (1879)
 Poems: Complete Edition (1881)
 The Jeffersons (1881)
 English Rambles and other Fugitive Pieces (Boston, 1884)
 Henry Irving (1885)  
 The Stage Life of Mary Anderson (1886)  
 Shakespeare's England (1888)  
 Brief Chronicles (1889)
 Gray Days and Gold (1889)  
 Old Shrines and Ivy (1892)
 Wanders, the Poems of William Winters (1892)  
 Shadows of the Stage (1892, 1893, and 1894)  
 The Life and art of Edwin Booth (1893)  
 The Life and Art of Joseph Jefferson (1894)  
 Brown Heath and Blue Bells (1896)  
 Ada Rehan (1898)  
 Other Days of the Stage (1908)  
 Old Friends (1909)  
 Poems (1909), definitive author's edition  
 Life and Art of Richard Mansfield (1910)  
 The Wallet of Time (1913)  
 a Life of Tyrone Power (1913)  
 Shakespeare on the Stage (two series, 1911–15)  
 Vagrant Memories (1915)

He has edited, with memoirs and notes:

 The Poems of George Arnold (Boston, 1866)
 Life, Stories, and Poems of John Brougham (1881)
 The Poems and Stories of Fitz-James O'Brien'' (1881)

References

External links

 William Winter Papers at the Harry Ransom Center
 William Winter Library at the Harry Ransom Center
 Robert Young Collection on William Winter at the Folger Shakespeare Library
 Brief biography and two poems
 
 
 

American biographers
American essayists
American literary critics
Harvard Law School alumni
People from Gloucester, Massachusetts
People from Staten Island
1836 births
1917 deaths
Historians from New York (state)
Deaths from angina pectoris
Members of the American Academy of Arts and Letters